Karl Gustav Henry Folmer Ahlefeldt (13 March 1910 – 25 March 1985) was a Danish film actor. He appeared in the Carl Theodor Dreyer masterpiece Gertrud (1965).

Filmography

References

External links

1910 births
1985 deaths
Danish male film actors
Male actors from Copenhagen
20th-century Danish male actors